Anzor Mekvabishvili (born 5 June 2001), is a Georgian professional footballer who plays as a midfielder or defender for Erovnuli Liga club Dinamo Tbilisi and the Georgia national team.

References

External links

2001 births
Living people
Footballers from Georgia (country)
Georgia (country) international footballers
Association football midfielders
FC Dinamo Tbilisi players